John Herbert Gleason (February 26, 1916June 24, 1987) was an American actor, comedian, writer, and composer known affectionately as "The Great One". Developing a style and characters from growing up in Brooklyn, New York, he was known for his brash visual and verbal comedy, exemplified by his city-bus-driver character Ralph Kramden in the television series The Honeymooners. He also developed The Jackie Gleason Show, which maintained high ratings from the mid-1950s through 1970. After originating in New York City, videotaping moved to Miami Beach, Florida, in 1964 after Gleason took up permanent residence there.

Among his notable film roles were Minnesota Fats in 1961's The Hustler (co-starring with Paul Newman) and Buford T. Justice in the Smokey and the Bandit series from 1977 to 1983 (co-starring Burt Reynolds).

Gleason enjoyed a prominent secondary music career during the 1950s and 1960s, producing a series of best-selling "mood music" albums. His first album, Music for Lovers Only, still holds the record for the longest stay on the Billboard Top Ten Charts (153 weeks), and his first 10 albums sold over a million copies each. His output spans some 20-plus singles, nearly 60 long-playing record albums, and over 40 CDs.

Early life
Gleason was born on February 26, 1916, at 364 Chauncey Street in the Stuyvesant Heights (now Bedford-Stuyvesant) section of Brooklyn. Named Herbert Walton Gleason Jr. at birth, he was baptized John Herbert Gleason and grew up at 328 Chauncey Street, Apartment 1A (an address he later used for Ralph and Alice Kramden on The Honeymooners). His parents were Herbert Walton "Herb" Gleason (1883–1939), born in New York City, and Mae Agnes "Maisie" (née Kelly; 1886–1935). Most sources indicate his mother was originally from Farranree, County Cork, Ireland. Gleason was the younger of two children; his elder brother, Clement, died of meningitis at age 14 in 1919.

Gleason remembered Clement and his father having "beautiful handwriting". He used to watch his father work at the family's kitchen table, writing insurance policies in the evenings. On the night of December 14, 1925, Gleason's father disposed of any family photos in which he appeared; just after noon on December 15, he collected his hat, coat, and paycheck, and permanently left his family and job at the insurance company. Once it became evident that he was not coming back, Mae went to work as a subway attendant for the Brooklyn–Manhattan Transit Corporation (BMT).

After his father abandoned the family, young Gleason began hanging around with a local gang, hustling pool. He attended P.S. 73 Elementary School in Brooklyn, John Adams High School in Queens, and Bushwick High School in Brooklyn. Gleason became interested in performing after being part of a class play; he quit school before graduating and got a job that paid $4per night as master of ceremonies at a theater. Other jobs he held at that time included pool hall worker, stunt driver, and carnival barker. Gleason and his friends made the rounds of the local theaters; he put an act together with one of his friends, and the pair performed on amateur night at the Halsey Theater, where Gleason replaced his friend Sammy Birch as master of ceremonies. He performed the same duties twice a week at the Folly Theater.

Gleason was 19 when his mother died in 1935 of sepsis from a large neck carbuncle that young Jackie had tried to lance. He had nowhere to go, and thirty-six cents to his name. The family of his first girlfriend, Julie Dennehy, offered to take him in; Gleason, however, was headstrong and insisted that he was going into the heart of the city. His friend Birch made room for him in the hotel room he shared with another comedian. Birch also told him of a week-long gig in Reading, Pennsylvania, which would pay $19—more money than Gleason could imagine. The booking agent advanced his bus fare for the trip against his salary, granting Gleason his first job as a professional comedian. Following this, he would always have regular work in small clubs.

Career
Gleason worked his way up to a job at New York's Club 18, where insulting its patrons was the order of the day. Gleason greeted noted skater Sonja Henie by handing her an ice cube and saying, "Okay, now do something." It was here that Jack L. Warner first saw Gleason, signing him to a film contract for $250 a week.

By age 24, Gleason was appearing in films: first for Warner Brothers (as Jackie C. Gleason) in such films as Navy Blues (1941) with Ann Sheridan and Martha Raye and All Through the Night (1941) with Humphrey Bogart; then for Columbia Pictures for the B military comedy Tramp, Tramp, Tramp; and finally for Twentieth Century-Fox, where Gleason played Glenn Miller Orchestra bassist Ben Beck in Orchestra Wives (1942). He also had a small part as a soda shop clerk in Larceny, Inc. (1942), with Edward G. Robinson and a modest part as an actor's agent in the 1942 Betty Grable–Harry James musical Springtime in the Rockies.

During World War II, Gleason was initially exempt from military service, since he was a father of two. However, in 1943 the US started drafting men with children. When Gleason reported to his induction, doctors discovered that his broken left arm had healed crooked (the area between his thumb and forefinger was nerveless and numb), that a pilonidal cyst existed at the end of his coccyx, and that he was 100 pounds overweight. Gleason was therefore classified 4-F and rejected for military service.

Gleason did not make a strong impression on Hollywood at first; at the time, he developed a nightclub act that included comedy and music. At the end of 1942, Gleason and Lew Parker led a large cast of entertainers in the road show production of Olsen and Johnson's New 1943 Hellzapoppin. He also became known for hosting all-night parties in his hotel suite; the hotel soundproofed his suite out of consideration for its other guests. "Anyone who knew Jackie Gleason in the 1940s", wrote CBS historian Robert Metz, "would tell you The Fat Man would never make it. His pals at Lindy's watched him spend money as fast as he soaked up the booze." Rodney Dangerfield wrote that he witnessed Gleason purchasing marijuana in the 1940s.

Gleason's first significant recognition as an entertainer came on Broadway when he appeared in the hit musical Follow the Girls (1944). While working in films in California, Gleason also worked at former boxer Maxie Rosenbloom's nightclub (Slapsy Maxie's, on Wilshire Boulevard).

Early television

Gleason's big break occurred in 1949, when he landed the role of blunt but softhearted aircraft worker Chester A. Riley for the first television version of the radio comedy The Life of Riley. (William Bendix had originated the role on radio but was initially unable to accept the television role because of film commitments.) Despite positive reviews, the show received modest ratings and was cancelled after one year. Bendix reprised the role in 1953 for a five-year series. The Life of Riley became a television hit for Bendix during the mid-to-late 1950s.
But long before this, Gleason's nightclub act had received attention from New York City's inner circle and the fledgling DuMont Television Network. He was working at Slapsy Maxie's when he was hired to host DuMont's Cavalcade of Stars variety hour in 1950, having been recommended by comedy writer Harry Crane, whom he knew from his days as a stand-up comedian in New York. The program initially had rotating hosts; Gleason was first offered two weeks at $750 per week. When he responded it was not worth the train trip to New York, the offer was extended to four weeks. Gleason returned to New York for the show. He framed the acts with splashy dance numbers, developed sketch characters he would refine over the next decade, and became enough of a presence that CBS wooed him to its network in 1952.

Renamed The Jackie Gleason Show, the program became the country's second-highest-rated television show during the 1954–55 season. Gleason amplified the show with even splashier opening dance numbers inspired by Busby Berkeley's screen dance routines and featuring the precision-choreographed June Taylor Dancers. Following the dance performance, he would do an opening monologue. Then, accompanied by "a little travelin' music" ("That's a Plenty", a Dixieland classic from 1914), he would shuffle toward the wings, clapping his hands and shouting, "And awaaay we go!" The phrase became one of his trademarks, along with "How sweet it is!" (which he used in reaction to almost anything). Theona Bryant, a former Powers Girl, became Gleason's "And awaaay we go" girl. Ray Bloch was Gleason's first music director, followed by Sammy Spear, who stayed with Gleason through the 1960s; Gleason often kidded both men during his opening monologues. He continued developing comic characters, including:
 Reginald Van Gleason III, a top-hatted millionaire with a taste for both the good life and fantasy;
 Rudy the Repairman, boisterous and boorish;
 Joe the Bartender, gregarious and with friendly words for the never-seen Mr. Dennehy (always first at the bar);
 The Poor Soul, a silent character who could (and often did) come to grief in the least-expected places (or demonstrated gratitude at such gifts as being allowed to share a newspaper on a subway);
 Rum Dum, a character with a brush-like mustache who often stumbled around as though drunk and confused;
 Fenwick Babbitt, a friendly, addle-headed young man usually depicted working at various jobs and invariably failing;
 Charlie Bratton, a loudmouth who frequently picked on the mild-mannered Clem Finch (portrayed by Art Carney, a future Honeymooners co-star);
 Stanley R. Sogg, a pitchman who usually appeared on commercials during late night movies and sold items that came with extras or bonuses (the ultimate inducement was a 10-pound wedge of Facciamara's Macciaroni cheese); and 
 The Bachelor, a silent character (accompanied by the song "Somebody Loves Me") doing everyday things in an unusually lazy (or makeshift) way.

In a 1985 interview, Gleason related some of his characters to his youth in Brooklyn. The Mr. Dennehy whom Joe the Bartender greets is a tribute to Gleason's first love, Julie Dennehy. The character of The Poor Soul was drawn from an assistant manager of an outdoor theater he frequented.

Gleason disliked rehearsing. With a photographic memory he read the script once, watched a rehearsal with his co-stars and stand-in, and shot the show later that day. When he made mistakes, he often blamed the cue cards.

The Honeymooners

Gleason's most popular character by far was blustery bus driver Ralph Kramden. Largely drawn from Gleason's harsh Brooklyn childhood, these sketches became known as The Honeymooners. The show was based on Ralph's many get-rich-quick schemes; his ambition; his antics with his best friend and neighbor, scatterbrained sewer worker Ed Norton; and clashes with his sensible wife, Alice, who typically pulled Ralph's head down from the clouds.

Gleason developed catchphrases he used on The Honeymooners, such as threats to Alice: "One of these days, Alice, pow! right in the kisser" and "Bang! Zoom! To the moon Alice, to the moon!"

The Honeymooners originated from a sketch Gleason was developing with his show's writers. He said he had an idea he wanted to enlarge: a skit with a smart, quiet wife and her very vocal husband. He went on to describe that, while the couple had their fights, underneath it all they loved each other. Titles for the sketch were tossed around until someone came up with The Honeymooners.

The Honeymooners first was featured on Cavalcade of Stars on October 5, 1951, with Carney in a guest appearance as a cop (Norton did not appear until a few episodes later) and character actress Pert Kelton as Alice. Darker and fiercer than the milder later version with Audrey Meadows as Alice, the sketches proved popular with critics and viewers. As Kramden, Gleason played a frustrated bus driver with a battleaxe of a wife in harrowingly realistic arguments; when Meadows (who was 15 years younger than Kelton) took over the role after Kelton was blacklisted, the tone softened considerably.

When Gleason moved to CBS, Kelton was left behind; her name had been published in Red Channels, a book that listed and described reputed communists (and communist sympathizers) in television and radio, and the network did not want to hire her. Gleason reluctantly let her leave the cast, with a cover story for the media that she had "heart trouble". At first, he turned down Meadows as Kelton's replacement. Meadows wrote in her memoir that she slipped back to audition again and frumped herself up to convince Gleason that she could handle the role of a frustrated (but loving) working-class wife. Rounding out the cast, Joyce Randolph played Trixie, Ed Norton's wife. Elaine Stritch had played the role as a tall and attractive blonde in the first sketch but was quickly replaced by Randolph. Comedy writer Leonard Stern always felt The Honeymooners was more than sketch material and persuaded Gleason to make it into a full-hour-long episode.

In 1955, Gleason gambled on making it a separate series entirely. These are the "Classic 39" episodes, which finished 19th in the ratings for their only season. They were filmed with a new DuMont process, Electronicam. Like kinescopes, it preserved a live performance on film; unlike kinescopes (which were screenshots), the film was of higher quality and comparable to a motion picture. That turned out to be Gleason's most prescient move. A decade later, he aired the half-hour Honeymooners in syndicated reruns that began to build a loyal and growing audience, making the show a television icon. Its popularity was such that in 2000 a life-sized statue of Jackie Gleason, in uniform as bus driver Ralph Kramden, was installed outside the Port Authority Bus Terminal in New York City.

Gleason went back to the live format for 1956–57 with short and long versions, including hour-long musicals. These musical presentations were reprised ten years later, in color, with Sheila MacRae and Jane Keane as Alice and Trixie.

Audrey Meadows reappeared for one black-and-white remake of the '50s sketch "The Adoption", telecast January 8, 1966. Ten years later she rejoined Gleason and Carney (with Jane Kean replacing Joyce Randolph) for several TV specials (one special from 1973 was shelved).

The Jackie Gleason Show ended in June 1957. In 1959, Jackie discussed the possibility of bringing back The Honeymooners in new episodes. His dream was partially realized with a Kramden-Norton sketch on a CBS variety show in late 1960 and two more sketches on his new hour-long CBS show The American Scene Magazine in 1962.

Music

Throughout the 1950s and 1960s, Gleason enjoyed a prominent secondary music career producing a series of best-selling "mood music" albums with jazz overtones for Capitol Records. Gleason believed there was a ready market for romantic instrumentals. His goal was to make "musical wallpaper that should never be intrusive, but conducive". He recalled seeing Clark Gable play love scenes in movies; the romance was, in his words, "magnified a thousand percent" by background music. Gleason reasoned, "If Gable needs music, a guy in Brooklyn must be desperate!"

Gleason's first album, Music for Lovers Only, still holds the record for the longest stay on the Billboard Top Ten Charts (153 weeks), and his first 10 albums sold over a million copies each. At one point, Gleason held the record for charting the most number-one albums on the Billboard 200 without charting any hits on the Top 40 of the Billboard Hot 100 singles chart.

Gleason could not read or write music; he was said to have conceived melodies in his head and described them vocally to assistants who transcribed them into musical notes. These included the well-remembered themes of both The Jackie Gleason Show ("Melancholy Serenade") and The Honeymooners ("You're My Greatest Love"). In spite of period accounts establishing his direct involvement in musical production, varying opinions have appeared over the years as to how much credit Gleason should have received for the finished products. Biographer William A. Henry wrote in his 1992 book, The Great One: The Life and Legend of Jackie Gleason, that beyond the possible conceptualizing of many of the song melodies, Gleason had no direct involvement (such as conducting) in making the recordings. Red Nichols, a jazz great who had fallen on hard times and led one of the group's recordings, was not paid as session-leader. Cornetist and trumpeter Bobby Hackett soloed on several of Gleason's albums and was leader for seven of them. Asked late in life by musician–journalist Harry Currie in Toronto what Gleason really did at the recording sessions, Hackett replied, "He brought the checks".

But years earlier Hackett had glowingly told writer James Bacon:

Jackie knows a lot more about music than people give him credit for. I have seen him conduct a 60-piece orchestra and detect one discordant note in the brass section. He would immediately stop the music and locate the wrong note. It always amazed the professional musicians how a guy who technically did not know one note from another could do that. And he was never wrong.

The composer and arranger George Williams has been cited in various biographies as having served as ghostwriter for the majority of arrangements heard on many of Gleason's albums of the 1950s and 1960s. Williams was not given credit for his work until the early 1960s, albeit only in small print on the backs of album covers.

Nearly all of Gleason's albums have been reissued on compact disc.

Gleason's lead role in the musical Take Me Along (1959–60) won him a Tony Award for Best Performance by a Leading Actor in a Musical.

Return to television

In 1956 Gleason revived his original variety hour (including The Honeymooners), winning a Peabody Award. He abandoned the show in 1957 when his ratings for the season came in at No. 29 and the network "suggested" he needed a break. He returned in 1958 with a half-hour show featuring Buddy Hackett, which did not catch on.

In addition to his salary and royalties, CBS paid for Gleason's Peekskill, New York, mansion "Round Rock Hill". Set on six acres, the architecturally noteworthy complex included a round main home, guest house, and storage building. It took Gleason two years to design the house, which was completed in 1959. Gleason sold the home when he relocated to Miami.

In October 1960, Gleason and Carney briefly returned for a Honeymooners sketch on a TV special. His next foray into television was the game show You're in the Picture, which was cancelled after a disastrously received premiere episode but was followed the next week by a broadcast of Gleason's humorous half-hour apology, which was much better appreciated. For the rest of its scheduled run, the game show was replaced by a talk show named The Jackie Gleason Show.

In 1962, Gleason resurrected his variety show with more splashiness and a new hook: a fictitious general-interest magazine called The American Scene Magazine, through which Gleason trotted out his old characters in new scenarios, including two new Honeymooners sketches. He also added another catchphrase to the American vernacular, first uttered in the 1963 film Papa's Delicate Condition: "How sweet it is!" The Jackie Gleason Show: The American Scene Magazine was a hit that continued for four seasons. Each show began with Gleason delivering a monologue and commenting on the attention-getting outfits of band leader Sammy Spear. Then the "magazine" features would be trotted out, from Hollywood gossip (reported by comedian Barbara Heller) to news flashes (played for laughs with a stock company of second bananas, chorus girls and dwarfs). Comedienne Alice Ghostley occasionally appeared as a downtrodden tenement resident sitting on her front step and listening to boorish boyfriend Gleason for several minutes. After the boyfriend took his leave, the smitten Ghostley would exclaim, "I'm the luckiest girl in the world!" Veteran comics Johnny Morgan, Sid Fields, and Hank Ladd were occasionally seen opposite Gleason in comedy sketches. Helen Curtis played alongside him as a singer and actress, delighting audiences with her 'Madame Plumpadore' sketches with 'Reginald Van Gleason.'

The final sketch was always set in Joe the Bartender's saloon with Joe singing "My Gal Sal" and greeting his regular customer, the unseen Mr. Dunahy (the TV audience, as Gleason spoke to the camera in this section). During the sketch, Joe would tell Dennehy about an article he had read in the fictitious American Scene magazine, holding a copy across the bar. It had two covers: one featured the New York skyline and the other palm trees (after the show moved to Florida). Joe would bring out Frank Fontaine as Crazy Guggenheim, who would regale Joe with the latest adventures of his neighborhood pals and sometimes show Joe his current Top Cat comic book. Joe usually asked Crazy to sing—almost always a sentimental ballad in his fine, lilting baritone.

Gleason revived The Honeymooners—first with Sue Ane Langdon as Alice and Patricia Wilson as Trixie for two episodes of The American Scene Magazine, then with Sheila MacRae as Alice and Jane Kean as Trixie for the 1966 series. By 1964 Gleason had moved the production from New York to Miami Beach, Florida, reportedly because he liked year-round access to the golf course at the nearby Inverrary Country Club in Lauderhill (where he built his final home). His closing line became, almost invariably, "As always, the Miami Beach audience is the greatest audience in the world!" In 1966, he abandoned the American Scene Magazine format and converted the show into a standard variety hour with guest performers.

Gleason kicked off the 1966–1967 season with new, color episodes of The Honeymooners. Carney returned as Ed Norton, with MacRae as Alice and Kean as Trixie. The sketches were remakes of the 1957 world-tour episodes, in which Kramden and Norton win a slogan contest and take their wives to international destinations. Each of the nine episodes was a full-scale musical comedy, with Gleason and company performing original songs by Lyn Duddy and Jerry Bresler. Occasionally Gleason would devote the show to musicals with a single theme, such as college comedy or political satire, with the stars abandoning their Honeymooners roles for different character roles. This was the show's format until its cancellation in 1970. (The exception was the 1968–1969 season, which had no hour-long Honeymooners episodes; that season, The Honeymooners was presented only in short sketches.) The musicals pushed Gleason back into the top five in ratings, but audiences soon began to decline. By its final season, Gleason's show was no longer in the top 25. In the last original Honeymooners episode aired on CBS ("Operation Protest" on February 28, 1970), Ralph encounters the youth-protest movement of the late 1960s, a sign of changing times in both television and society.

Gleason (who had signed a deal in the 1950s that included a guaranteed $100,000 annual payment for 20 years, even if he never went on the air) wanted The Honeymooners to be just a portion of his format, but CBS wanted another season of only The Honeymooners. The network had cancelled a mainstay variety show hosted by Red Skelton and would cancel The Ed Sullivan Show in 1971 because they had become too expensive to produce and attracted, in the executives' opinion, too old an audience. Gleason simply stopped doing the show in 1970 and left CBS when his contract expired.

Honeymooners revival
Gleason did two Jackie Gleason Show specials for CBS after giving up his regular show in the 1970s, including Honeymooners segments and a Reginald Van Gleason III sketch in which the gregarious millionaire was portrayed as a comic drunk. When the CBS deal expired, Gleason signed with NBC. He later did a series of Honeymooners specials for ABC. Gleason hosted four ABC specials during the mid-1970s. Gleason and Carney also made a television movie, Izzy and Moe (1985), about an unusual pair of historic Federal prohibition agents in New York City who achieved an unbeatable arrest record with highly successful techniques including impersonations and humor, which aired on CBS in 1985.

In April 1974, Gleason revived several of his classic characters (including Ralph Kramden, Joe the Bartender and Reginald Van Gleason III) in a television special with Julie Andrews. In a song-and-dance routine, the two performed "Take Me Along" from Gleason's Broadway musical.

In 1985, three decades after the "Classic 39" began filming, Gleason revealed he had carefully preserved kinescopes of his live 1950s programs in a vault for future use (including Honeymooners sketches with Pert Kelton as Alice). These "lost episodes" (as they came to be called) were initially previewed at the Museum of Television and Radio in New York City, aired on the Showtime cable network in 1985, and later were added to the Honeymooners syndication package.
Some of them include earlier versions of plot lines later used in the 'classic 39' episodes. One (a Christmas episode duplicated several years later with Meadows as Alice) had all Gleason's best-known characters (Ralph Kramden, the Poor Soul, Rudy the Repairman, Reginald Van Gleason, Fenwick Babbitt and Joe the Bartender) featured in and outside of the Kramden apartment. The storyline involved a wild Christmas party hosted by Reginald Van Gleason up the block from the Kramdens' building at Joe the Bartender's place.

Film

Gleason did not restrict his acting to comedic roles. He had also earned acclaim for live television drama performances in "The Laugh Maker" (1953) on CBS's Studio One and William Saroyan's "The Time of Your Life" (1958), which was produced as an episode of the anthology series Playhouse 90.

He was nominated for a Best Supporting Actor Academy Award for his portrayal of pool shark Minnesota Fats in The Hustler (1961), starring Paul Newman. Gleason made all his own trick pool shots. In his 1985 appearance on The Tonight Show, Gleason told Johnny Carson that he had played pool frequently since childhood, and drew from those experiences in The Hustler. He was extremely well-received as a beleaguered boxing manager in the film version of Rod Serling's Requiem for a Heavyweight (1962). Gleason played a world-weary army sergeant in Soldier in the Rain (1963), in which he received top billing over Steve McQueen.

 
Gleason wrote, produced and starred in Gigot (1962), in which he played a poor, mute janitor who befriended and rescued a prostitute and her small daughter. It was a box office flop. But the film's script was adapted and produced as the television film The Wool Cap (2004), starring William H. Macy in the role of the mute janitor; the television film received modestly good reviews.

Gleason played the lead in the Otto Preminger-directed Skidoo (1968), considered an all-star failure. In 1969 William Friedkin wanted to cast Gleason as "Popeye" Doyle in The French Connection (1971), but because of the poor reception of Gigot and Skidoo, the studio refused to offer Gleason the lead; he wanted it. Instead, Gleason wound up in How to Commit Marriage (1969) with Bob Hope, as well as the movie version of Woody Allen's play Don't Drink the Water (1969). Both were unsuccessful.

Eight years passed before Gleason had another hit film. This role was the cantankerous and cursing Texas sheriff Buford T. Justice in the films Smokey and the Bandit (1977), Smokey and the Bandit II (1980) and Smokey and the Bandit Part 3 (1983). He co-starred with Burt Reynolds as the Bandit, Sally Field as Carrie (the Bandit's love interest), and Jerry Reed as Cledus "Snowman" Snow, the Bandit's truck-driving partner. Former NFL linebacker Mike Henry played his dimwitted son, Junior Justice. Gleason's gruff and frustrated demeanor and lines such as "I'm gonna barbecue yo' ass in molasses!" made the first Bandit movie a hit.

Years later, when interviewed by Larry King, Reynolds said he agreed to do the film only if the studio hired Jackie Gleason to play the part of Sheriff Buford T. Justice (the name of a real Florida highway patrolman, who knew Reynolds' father). Reynolds said that director Hal Needham gave Gleason free rein to ad-lib a great deal of his dialog and make suggestions for the film; the scene at the "Choke and Puke" was Gleason's idea. Reynolds and Needham knew Gleason's comic talent would help make the film a success, and Gleason's characterization of Sheriff Justice strengthened the film's appeal to blue-collar audiences.

During the 1980s, Gleason earned positive reviews playing opposite Laurence Olivier in the HBO dramatic two-man special, Mr. Halpern and Mr. Johnson (1983). He also gave a memorable performance as wealthy businessman U.S. Bates in the comedy The Toy (1982) opposite Richard Pryor. Although the film was critically panned, Gleason and Pryor's performances were praised. His last film performance was opposite Tom Hanks in the Garry Marshall-directed Nothing in Common (1986), a success both critically and financially.

Personal life

Fear of flying
For many years, Gleason would travel only by train; his fear of flying arose from an incident in his early film career. Gleason would fly back and forth to Los Angeles for relatively minor film work. After finishing one film, the comedian boarded a plane for New York. When two of the plane's engines cut out in the middle of the flight, the pilot had to make an emergency landing in Tulsa, Oklahoma.

Although another plane was prepared for the passengers, Gleason had enough of flying. He went into downtown Tulsa, walked into a hardware store, and asked its owner to lend him $200 for the train trip to New York. The owner asked Gleason why he thought anyone would lend a stranger so much money. Gleason identified himself and explained his situation. The store owner said he would lend the money if the local theater had a photo of Gleason in his latest film. However, the publicity shots showed only the principal stars. Gleason proposed to buy two tickets to the film and take the store owner; he would be able to see the actor in action. The two men watched the film for an hour before Gleason appeared on screen. The owner gave Gleason the loan, and he took the next train to New York. There, he borrowed $200 to repay his benefactor.

Interest in the paranormal

Gleason was greatly interested in the paranormal, reading many books on the topic, as well as books on parapsychology and UFOs. During the 1950s, he was a semi-regular guest on a paranormal-themed overnight radio show hosted by John Nebel, and he also wrote the introduction to Donald Bain's biography of Nebel. After his death, his large book collection was donated to the library of the University of Miami. A complete listing of the holdings of Gleason's library has been issued by the online cataloging service LibraryThing.

According to writer Larry Holcombe, Gleason's known interest in UFOs allegedly prompted President Richard Nixon to share some information with him and to disclose some UFO data publicly.

Marriages and family

Gleason met dancer Genevieve Halford when they were working in vaudeville, and they started to date. Halford wanted to marry, but Gleason was not ready to settle down. She said she would see other men if they did not marry. One evening when Gleason went onstage at the Club Miami in Newark, New Jersey, he saw Halford in the front row with a date. At the end of his show, Gleason went to the table and proposed to Halford in front of her date. They were married on September 20, 1936.

Halford wanted a quiet home life but Gleason fell back into spending his nights out. Separated for the first time in 1941 and reconciled in 1948, the couple had two daughters, Geraldine ( 1940) and Linda (b. 1942). Gleason and his wife informally separated again in 1951. It was during this period that Gleason had a romantic relationship with his secretary Honey Merrill, who was Miss Hollywood of 1956 and a showgirl at The Tropicana. Their relationship ended years later after Merrill met and eventually married Dick Roman.

In early 1954, Gleason suffered a broken leg and ankle on-air during his television show. His injuries sidelined him for several weeks. Halford visited Gleason while he was hospitalized, finding dancer Marilyn Taylor from his television show there. Halford filed for a legal separation in April 1954. A devout Catholic, Halford did not grant Gleason a divorce until 1970.

Gleason met his second wife, Beverly McKittrick, at a country club in 1968, where she worked as a secretary. Ten days after his divorce from Halford was final, Gleason and McKittrick were married in a registry ceremony in Ashford, England on July 4, 1970.

In 1974, Marilyn Taylor encountered Gleason again when she moved to the Miami area to be near her sister June, whose dancers had starred on Gleason's shows for many years. She had been out of show business for nearly 20 years. In September 1974, Gleason filed for divorce from McKittrick (who contested, asking for a reconciliation). The divorce was granted on November 19, 1975. As a widow with a young son, Marilyn Taylor married Gleason on December 16, 1975; the marriage lasted until his death in 1987.

Gleason's daughter Linda became an actress and married actor-playwright Jason Miller. Their son, Gleason's grandson, is actor Jason Patric.

Later years, health issues and death
As early as 1952, when The Jackie Gleason Show captured Saturday night for CBS, Gleason regularly smoked six packs of cigarettes a day, but he never smoked on The Honeymooners.

In 1978, he suffered chest pains while touring in the lead role of Larry Gelbart's play Sly Fox; this forced him to leave the show in Chicago and go to the hospital. He was treated and released, but after suffering another bout the following week, he returned and underwent triple-bypass surgery.

Gleason delivered a critically acclaimed performance as an infirm, acerbic, and somewhat Archie Bunker-like character in the Tom Hanks comedy-drama Nothing in Common (1986). This was Gleason's final film role. During production, it was determined that he was suffering from terminal colon cancer, which had metastasized to his liver. Gleason was also suffering from phlebitis and diabetes. "I won't be around much longer", he told his daughter at dinner one evening after a day of filming. Gleason kept his medical problems private, although there were rumors that he was seriously ill. A year later, on June 24, 1987, Gleason died at age 71 in his Florida home.

After a funeral Mass at the Cathedral of Saint Mary, Gleason was entombed in a sarcophagus in a private outdoor mausoleum at Our Lady of Mercy Catholic Cemetery in Miami. Gleason's sister-in-law, June Taylor of the June Taylor Dancers, is buried to the left of the mausoleum, next to her husband.

Legacy and honors

 Miami Beach in 1987 renamed the Miami Beach Auditorium as the Jackie Gleason Theater of the Performing Arts. , the theater was scheduled to be razed as part of a convention-center remodeling project and replaced by a hotel. The demolition did not take place and The Fillmore Miami Beach is still in operation .
 Gleason was inducted into the Academy of Television Arts & Sciences Television Hall of Fame in 1986. In 2000 a statue of him as Ralph Kramden in "And away we go!" pose was installed at the Miami Beach Bus Terminal.
 Gleason was nominated three times for an Emmy Award, but never won. (Carney and Keane did, however.) 
In 1976 at the Sixth Annual American Guild of Variety Artists (AGVA) "Entertainer of the Year Awards", Paul Lynde received an award for being voted the funniest man of the year. Lynde immediately turned his award over to host Jackie Gleason, citing him as "the funniest man ever." The unexpected gesture shocked Gleason.
 On June 30, 1988, the Sunset Park MTA, NYCT's 5th Avenue Bus Depot in Brooklyn was renamed the Jackie Gleason Depot in honor of the native Brooklynite.
 A statue of Gleason as Ralph Kramden in his bus driver's uniform was dedicated in August 2000 in New York City in Manhattan at the 40th Street entrance of the Port Authority Bus Terminal (PABT). The statue was briefly shown in the film World Trade Center (2006).
 A city park in Lauderhill, Florida, was named the "Jackie Gleason Park" in his honor; it is located near his former home and features racquetball and basketball courts and a children's playground.
 Signs on the Brooklyn Bridge which advise drivers that they are entering Brooklyn have the Gleason phrase "How Sweet It Is!"
 Late in his life actor-playwright Jason Miller, Gleason's former son-in-law, was writing a screenplay based on Gleason's life. He died before it was completed.
 Gleason was portrayed by Brad Garrett in a 2002 television biopic about his life.

Works

Television
1949–1959

 Your Sports Special (1949) as Himself
 The Lamb's Gambol (March 27, 1949) as Himself
 On The Two A Day (1949, NBC TV) as Himself
 The Life of Riley (October 4, 1949 – March 28, 1950, TV Series) as Chester A. Riley
 The Arrow Show (1949) as Himself
 Tex and Jinx (1949) as Himself
 This Is Show Business (1950) as Himself
 Showtime USA (1950) as Himself
 Cavalcade of Stars (1950–1952, TV Series) as Himself - Host / Ralph Kramden / Reginald Van Gleason III
 The Frank Sinatra Show (1950) as Himself
 Ford Star Revue (1951) as Himself
 The Frank Sinatra Show (1951) as Himself
 Cavalcade of Bands (1951) as Himself
 Stage Entrance (1951, DuMont TV) as Himself
 Musical Comedy Time: No! No! Nanette! (1951) as Himself
 Texaco Star Theatre (1951) as Himself
 Ford Festival (1951) as Himself
 The James Melton Show (May 3, 1951) as Himself
 This Is Show Business (1951) as Himself
 The Colgate Comedy Hour (1951) as Himself
 Ford Star Revue (1951) as Himself
 The Colgate Comedy Hour (1951) as Himself
 The Kate Smith Evening Hour (1951) as Himself
 The Jackie Gleason Show (September 20, 1952 – June 18, 1955, TV Series) as Host / Ralph Kramden / Reginald Van Gleason III
 Arthur Murray Party (1952) as Himself
 The Sam Levinson Show (1952) as Himself
 The Ken Murray Show (1952) as Himself
 Toast of the Town (1952) as Himself
 Celebrity Time (1952) as Himself
 Scout O' Rama (1952) as Himself
 Jane Froman's USA Canteen (1952) as Himself
 Arthur Godfrey and His Friends (1953) as Himself
 Studio One: The Laugh Maker (May 18, 1953, TV Movie) as Himself
 What's My Line? (1953) as Himself
 This Is Show Business (1953) as Himself - Guest / Himself
 Arthur Murray Party (1953) as Himself
 Toast of the Town (1954) as Himself
 The Red Skelton Show (January 5, 1954) as Himself
 Name That Tune (1954) as Himself
 Studio One: Short Cut (December 6, 1954, TV Movie) as Himself
 The Best of Broadway: The Show Off (February 2, 1955, TV Movie) as Himself
 What's My Line? (1955) as Himself
 I've Got a Secret (1955) as Himself
 The Jack Benny Program (May 1, 1955) as Himself
 Stage Show (1955) as Himself
 The Honeymooners (October 1, 1955 – September 22, 1956, TV Series) as Ralph Kramden
 The Red Skelton Show (October 4, 1955)
 Studio One: Uncle Ed and Circumstances (October 10, 1955, TV Movie)
 The $64,000 Question (1956) as Himself
 Person to Person (February 3, 1956) as Himself
 The Herb Shriner Show (October 2, 1956) as Himself
 The Jackie Gleason Show (September 29, 1956 – June 22, 1957, TV Series) as Himself
 Playhouse 90: The Time of Your Life (October 9, 1958, TV Movie) as Joe
 This Is Your Life (1958) as Himself
 Arthur Godfrey Show (1958) as Himself
 The Jackie Gleason Show (October 1958 – January 1959, TV Series) as Himself
 All Star Jazz IV: The Golden Age of Jazz (January 4, 1959) as Himself

1960–1986

 The Fabulous Fifties (1960) as Narrator
 Arthur Godfrey Special (1960) as Himself
 The Secret World of Eddie Hodges (June 23, 1960) (TV Movie, [narration only]) as Narrator / Himself
 The Jackie Gleason Special: The Big Sell Review (October 9, 1960) as Salesman / Reginald Van Gleason III / Joe the Bartender / Ralph Kramden
 Step On the Gas (CBS-10/19/60) TV special
 The Red Skelton Show (January 24, 1961) as Himself
 Sunday Sports Spectacular: Jackie Gleason with the putter and cue (1961) as Himself
 You're In the Picture/The Jackie Gleason Show (January 27 – March 24, 1961) as Himself
 The Jackie Gleason Special: The Million Dollar Incident (April 21, 1961) as Himself
 Jackie Gleason and His American Scene Magazine (September 29, 1962 – June 4, 1966, TV Series) as Himself
 The 35th Annual Academy Awards (1963) as Himself
 Freedom Spectacular (May 14, 1964, NAACP Special) as Himself
 Inquiry (June 13, 1965, June 20, 1965, NBC) as Himself
 The Bob Hope Chrysler Theatre: The Big Stomach (November 16, 1966) as the Vast Waistline
 The Jackie Gleason Show (September 17, 1966 – September 12, 1970, TV Series) as Himself - Host
 Here's Lucy: Lucy Visits Jack Benny (September 30, 1968) as Ralph Kramden
 The Mike Douglas Show (October 15, 1968) as Himself
 The David Frost Show (February 17, 1970) as Himself
 The David Frost Show (April 6, 1970) as Himself
 The David Frost Show (May 7, 1970) as Himself
 The Jackie Gleason Special (December 20, 1970) as Ralph Kramden / Reginald Van Gleason III / the Poor Soul
 The Mike Douglas Show (November 13–17, 20-24 and 29, 1972) as Himself
 The Jackie Gleason Special (November 11, 1973) as Ralph Kramden / Reginald Van Gleason III / the Poor Soul
 Show Business Tribute to Milton Berle (1973)
 Julie & Jackie: How Sweet It Is! (1974)
 Bob Hope Special (1974) as Himself
 The Dean Martin Celebrity Roast (1975) as Himself
 The Dick Cavett Show (August 30, 1975) as Himself
 Dinah! (January 13, 1975) as Himself
 Lucille Ball and Jackie Gleason: Two for Three (December 3, 1975) as Himself
 Super Night at the Super Bowl (1976) as Himself
 The Mike Douglas Show (January 12–16, 1976) as Himself
 The Honeymooners Second Honeymoon (February 2, 1976) as Ralph Kramden
 Donahue (1976) as Himself
 The Captain and Tennille (September 20, 1976) as Himself
 Bing Crosby's White Christmas (1976) as Himself
 Dinah! (February 11, 1977) as Himself
 The Honeymooners Christmas Special (November 28, 1977) as Ralph Kramden
 The Honeymooners Valentine Special (February 13, 1978) as Ralph Kramden
 The Second Honeymooners Christmas Special (December 10, 1978) as Ralph Kramden
 The Mike Douglas Show (May 7, 1980) as Himself
 Mr. Halpern and Mr. Johnson (June 3, 1983, TV Movie) as Ernest Johnson
 All Star Party for Burt Reynolds (1984) as Himself
 60 Minutes (1984) as Himself
 Izzy and Moe (September 23, 1985, TV Movie) as Himself
 The Honeymooners Reunion (May 13, 1985) as Ralph Kramden
 The 39th Annual Tony Awards (June 2, 1985) as Himself
 The Honeymooners Anniversary Celebration (October 18, 1985) as Ralph Kramden
 The Tonight Show Starring Johnny Carson (October 18, 1985) as Himself
 Gleason: In His Own Words (February 14, 1986) as Himself

Stage

 Keep Off the Grass (1940)
 Hellzapoppin (1942)
 Artists and Models (1943)
 Follow the Girls (1944)
 The Duchess Misbehaves (1945)

 Heaven on Earth (1948)
 Along Fifth Avenue (1949)
 Take Me Along (1959)
 Sly Fox (1978)

Film

 Navy Blues (1941) as Tubby
 Steel Against the Sky (1941) as Starchy
 All Through the Night (1942) as Starchy
 Lady Gangster (1942) as Wilson
 Tramp, Tramp, Tramp (1942) as Hank
 Larceny, Inc. (1942) as Hobart
 Escape from Crime (1942) as Screwball Evans
 Orchestra Wives (1942) as Ben Beck
 Springtime in the Rockies (1942) as Commissioner (uncredited)
 The Desert Hawk (1950) as Aladdin
 The Hustler (1961) as Minnesota Fats
 Gigot (1962) as Gigot (also writer)
 Requiem for a Heavyweight (1962) as Maish Rennick
 Papa's Delicate Condition (1963) as Jack Griffith
 Soldier in the Rain (1963) as MSgt. Maxwell Slaughter
 Skidoo (1968) as Tony Banks
 How to Commit Marriage (1969) as Oliver Poe
 Don't Drink the Water (1969) as Walter Hollander
 How Do I Love Thee? (1970) as Stanley Waltz
 Mr. Billion (1977) as John Cutler
 Smokey and the Bandit (1977) as Sheriff Buford T. Justice of Portague County
 Smokey and the Bandit II (1980) as Sheriff Buford T. Justice / Gaylord Justice / Reginald Van Justice
 The Toy (1982) as U.S. Bates
 The Sting II (1983) as Fargo Gondorff
 Smokey and the Bandit Part 3 (1983) as Buford T. Justice
 Izzy and Moe (1985) as Izzy Einstein
 Nothing in Common (1986) as Max Basner (final film role)

Music

Singles discography

Album discography

Compact disc discography
{| class="wikitable"
|-
! Year
! Title
! Label
|-
| 1984
| Lush Moods
| Pair
|-
| 1987
| Music, Martinis and Memories
| Capitol
|-
| 1987
| Intimate Music for Lovers
| CEMA Special Markets
|-
| 1990
| Merry Christmas
| Capitol
|-
| 1991
| Night Winds / Music to Make You Misty
| Capitol
|-
| 1993
| The Best of Jackie Gleason
| Curb
|-
| 1994
| Shangri-La
| Pair
|-
| 1995
| Merry Christmas
| Razor & Tie
|-
| 1995
| Body & Soul
| Pair
|-
| 1995
| 22 Melancholy Serenades
| CEMA Special Markets
|-
| 1996
| And Awaaay We Go
| Scamp
|-
| 1996
| How Sweet It Is! The Velvet Brass Collection
| Razor & Tie
|-
| 1996
| Romantic Moods of Jackie Gleason (Two Disc Set)
| EMI Capitol
|-
| 1996
| Thinking of You
| CEMA Special Markets
|-
| 1996
| Tis the Season| Capitol
|-
| 1996
| The Best of Jackie Gleason| Collectibles
|-
| 1999
| Music for Lovers Only / Music to Make You Misty| Collector's Choice
|-
| 2000
| Best of Jackie Gleason| EMI Special Products
|-
| 2000
| Tawny / Music, Martinis and Memories| Collector's Choice
|-
| 2000
| Music, Moonlight and Memories (Three Disc Set)
| Reader's Digest
|-
| 2001
| Lonesome Echo| Collector's Choice
|-
| 2001
| Music to Remember Her| Collector's Choice
|-
| 2001
| Lover's Rhapsody / And Awaaay We Go| Collector's Choice
|-
| 2001
| Snowfall| EMI
|-
| 2002
| For Lovers Only: 36 All Time Greatest Hits (Three disc set)
| Timeless Media Group
|-
| 2003
| Plays Romantic Jazz| Collector's Choice
|-
| 2004
| Music to Change Her Mind| Collector's Choice
|-
| 2005
| Night Winds| Collector's Choice
|-
| 2006
| A Taste of Brass & Doublin' in Brass| Capitol
|-
| 2007
| Complete Bobby Hackett Sessions (Four Disc Set)
| Fine & Mellow
|-
| 2009
| Take Me Along (1959 Original Broadway Cast)| DRG
|-
| 2009
| '''Tis the Season
| Capitol
|-
| 2011
| That Moment / Opiate D'Amour
| Dutton Vocalion
|-
| 2011
| The Torch with the Blue Flame / The Best of 'Oooo!' 
| Dutton Vocalion
|-
| 2012
| Music For Lovers Only
| Real Gone Music
|-
| 2012
| Movie Themes - For Lovers Only / The Last Dance - For Lovers Only
| Dutton Vocalion
|-
| 2012
| Romeo and Juliet - A Theme for Lovers / Music Around the World - For Lovers Only
| Dutton Vocalion
|-
| 2012
| Gigot
| Dutton Vocalion
|-
| 2012
| Champagne, Candlelight and Kisses / Love Embers and Flame
| Dutton Vocalion
|-
| 2012
| Tis the Season / Merry Christmas| Relayer Records
|}

References

Sources
 Joel Whitburn Presents the Billboard Albums, 6th edition, 
 
 Additional information obtained can be verified within Billboards online archive services and print editions of the magazine.

Further reading
 Bishop, Jim. The Golden Ham (Simon & Schuster, 1956).
 Metz, Robert. CBS: Reflections in a Bloodshot Eye. (New York, 1975).
 Bacon, James. How Sweet It Is: Jackie Gleason. (New York, St. Martin's Press, 1985).
 Weatherby, W.J. Jackie Gleason: An Intimate Portrait of the Great One. (Pharos Books, 1992).
 Henry, William A. The Great One: The Life and Legend of Jackie Gleason. (New York: Doubleday, 1992).
 Meadows, Audrey. Love, Alice. (New York, Crown Publishers, 1994).
 American Legends Series. The Life of Jackie Gleason''. (Charles River Editors, 2014).

External links

 
 
 
Jackie Gleason Discography at Space Age Pop Music
 Honeymooners at The Fifties Web
 Cavalcade of Stars 1950 episode at Internet Archive

1916 births
1987 deaths
20th-century American comedians
20th-century American composers
20th-century American conductors (music)
20th-century American male actors
20th-century American male musicians
American game show hosts
American male comedians
American male comedy actors
American male composers
American male conductors (music)
American male film actors
American male musical theatre actors
American male television actors
American people of Irish descent
Bibliophiles
Burials in Florida
Bushwick High School alumni
Capitol Records artists
Catholics from Florida
Catholics from New York (state)
Comedians from Florida
Comedians from New York (state)
Comedians from New York City
Deaths from cancer in Florida
Deaths from colorectal cancer
Deaths from liver cancer
Easy listening musicians
Florida Republicans
John Adams High School (Queens) alumni
Male actors from Florida
Male actors from New York (state)
Male actors from New York City
Musicians from Brooklyn
New York (state) Republicans
Peabody Award winners
People from Bedford–Stuyvesant, Brooklyn
People from Bushwick, Brooklyn
People from Lauderhill, Florida
Tony Award winners
Vaudeville performers